Susan Coppula, née Susan Carol Cute (born 1952) is an American writer of romance novels under her pen names, Susan Carroll and Serena Richards since 1986.

Biography
Born Susan Carol Cute in 1952, Susan Coppula obtained a Degree in English with complementary studies in History in the Indiana University  Since 1986, Susan has published books under three different pseudonyms: Susan Carroll, Susan Coppula, and Serena Richards. Susan lives in Rock Island, Illinois.

Awards
The Sugar Rose: 1988 Rita Awards Best Novel winner
Brighton Road: 1989 Rita Awards Best Novel winner
The Bride Finder: 1999 Rita Awards Best Novel winner

Bibliography

As Susan Carroll

Stand alone novels
The Lady Who Hated Shakespeare,	1986/No
The Sugar Rose,	1987/Jul
Brighton Road,	1988/Oct
The Bishop's Daughter,	1990/Sep
The Wooing of Miss Masters,	1991/Sep
Mistress Mischief,	1992/Jul
Christmas Belles,	1992/Sep
Miss Prentiss and the Yankee,	1993/Nov
The Valentine's Day Ball,	1993/Dec
Black Lace and Linen,	1994/Fev
Love Power,	1994/Aug
The Painted Veil,	1995/Aug
Parker and the Gypsy,	1997/Sep

St. Leger Family Saga Series
The Bride Finder,	1998/Sep
The Night Drifter,	1999/Sep
Midnight Bride (originally titled Valentine's Bride), 2001/Apr

The Dark Queen Saga
The Dark Queen,	  2005/Mar series 1 
The Courtesan,	  2005/Jul
The Silver Rose,	  2006/Mar
The Huntress,        2007/Jul
Twilight of a Queen, 2009/Jul
The Lady of Secrets, 2012/Dec

Omnibus
Brighton Road / The Sugar Rose,	1994/Jun

As Susan Coppula

Winter Macy Series
Winterbourne,	1987/Mar
Shades of winter,	1988

Single novels
Avenging Angel,	1991

As Serena Richards

Single novels
Masquerade,	1989
Escapade,	1991
Rendezvous,	1991

References

External links
Fantastic Fiction Susan Carrol at Fantastic Fiction

1952 births
20th-century American novelists
21st-century American novelists
American romantic fiction writers
American women novelists
Place of birth missing (living people)
RITA Award winners
Living people
20th-century American women writers
21st-century American women writers